That Thing Called Tadhana (International title: That Thing Called Destiny) is a 2014 Filipino romantic comedy film directed by Antoinette Jadaone who had already worked with Panganiban in the 2014 comedy film, Beauty in a Bottle. It follows Mace (Angelica Panganiban) and Anthony (JM de Guzman), who meet at an airport in Rome and upon arriving in the Philippines, decide to go places together. While Mace tries to forget and move on from a failed relationship, Anthony recalls his own disappointments, failures and struggles. In the process of trying to mend their broken hearts, they develop a kinship that progressively deepens as they get to know each other better.

Plot

Rome
The film starts at an airport in Rome where Mace, on her way back to the Philippines, despairs over which of her personal items to keep so she does not exceed the load requirements. As she bemoans her fate and cries over her dilemma, Anthony shows up and offers to carry her extra baggage for her through his unused extra baggage allowance. Mace later reveals that her whole life is in her luggage.

On the plane, Mace watches and emotionally connects with the protagonists of the film One More Chance but vehemently declines the pack of tissues offered to her.

Manila
Upon arrival at NAIA, they go to a Japanese restaurant after Mace expresses her reluctance to go straight home. Anthony shares his reasons for being in Rome but finds that Mace does not share the amazement. Their small talk is cut short when a fellow patron, who has nonchalantly been ignoring an incoming call, irritates Mace. Much later, Mace questions the merit of leaving the future of one's relationship to the winds of fate, or what destiny has to dictate, and declares that it did not sit well with her because she would have done something about it. She then begins to talk about her relationship that just recently ended. An eight-year-long relationship that was broken in just seven words. 
They later on end up in a karaoke bar where they sing "Where Do Broken Hearts Go" together. In a drunken stupor, Mace tells Anthony that she wants to go to Baguio.

On the bus to Baguio, Mace associates a film being shown to a memory she has with her ex-boyfriend. Then at a stopover, after she does the same to everything that Anthony comes up with, she strikes up a deal with him as a means of conditioning herself against the habit. Still, Mace cannot help but ask "- how does one forget?" and "- how long does one take to do it?". Anthony points out that "- what's important is to forget" - how and how long was "- up to her".

Baguio
In Baguio, Mace makes up her mind about what to do next, declines Anthony's offer to help and lugs her baggage around on her own - something that, although slow, is still manageable. At an art exhibit, Mace discovers Anthony's unfulfilled passion for painting overshadowed by a life driven by requirements and deadlines. So, over lunch, she asks Anthony to illustrate a short story she has written in college entitled "The Arrow with a Heart Pierced Through Him". Later that night, Mace awakens from a dream involving her ex-boyfriend. Anthony reveals that his dream has been of the two of them just walking along Session Road.

Inside a café in Session Road, Mace talks about how she waited eight years for a question that never came. Anthony admits to having been unprepared and shares the loss and pain that he has suffered thereafter along with all other sorts of questions that has gone unanswered. Mace then quotes F. Scott Fitzgerald back to him.

Outside the café, Anthony reassures her that she is not ugly at all, tells her that she will recover because it is impossible for an overwhelming love like hers to be wasted or go unreciprocated and quotes Popoy's line from the film One More Chance. He also reveals to her what he has done in order to forget and move on from his ex-girlfriend who has long since moved on and forgotten about him.

Sagada
Upon arriving in Sagada, Mace realizes that their belongings have been left behind. While a frantic Anthony tries to negotiate a way to go back, Mace tells him that the baggage does not matter anymore in her present life. As they await for the jeepney bound for Mount Kiltepan, in the freezing cold, Anthony gallantly drapes his sweater across her shoulders and for the first time spend a few minutes together in thoughtful silence.

They arrive at the camp late in the evening, lie down next to the fire beneath the open sky and talk about what they will wish for if a shooting star was to appear. They drift off to sleep, content with the idea that their wishes will surely be granted.
 
The next day dawns and they run together to a place at the edge of the mountain and the sea of clouds. There, Mace unloads herself of everything, screams all of her anger, all of her pain and of everything she has been unable say to her ex-boyfriend.

Epilogue
Mace asks about what they did upon reaching the far end of Session Road in his dream. Anthony reveals that he woke up before he got to that part but tells her that if he were to add something to it, it would be that she turns to him slowly to say she will forget her ex-boyfriend.

After a brief moment of silence, Mace replies and says "I will forget him."

On the way home Anthony was walking Mace home when they found out that her ex Marco was by the gate waiting for Mace with a bouquet of flowers asking for another chance. Anthony and Mace were shocked so Anthony said goodbye to give them some time to talk.

On his way home Anthony was shocked with everything that happened for the past couple of days. All he did was smile.

Mace’s short story played. The Arrow was feeling heavier than usual even after losing The Heart pierced through him. The Arrow kept on going until he met The Heart again.

The story resumed in where Anthony was driving through Manila. He was thinking about what Mace said about leaving your fate to the wind. He said to himself that if you really love someone, you should go for it and not wait for the wind to blow her back to you and that you should pull so hard and not let go as long as you can.

Some time in the future, Anthony decides to illustrate Mace's story, The Arrow with a Heart Pierced Through Him, and prepares to deliver it to her.

Cast

Angelica Panganiban as Mace Castillo, who has been to Rome to surprise her boyfriend only to find out that he already has someone else. She then undergoes a self-imposed catharsis with Anthony's help and travels with him to Baguio and Sagada to find out the answer to "where do broken hearts go?".
JM de Guzman as Anthony Lagdameo, a fellow passenger who offers Mace a solution to her problem on excess baggage. He is able to establish trust, then a connection and eventually travels with Mace as she tries to get over the abrupt end of an eight-year relationship.
Joem Bascon as Marco, Mace's boyfriend of eight years who extends his stay in Italy for his job and enters into a relationship with someone else. Mace claims that he looks like John Lloyd Cruz and can associate many things with him.

Production
Director Antoinette Jadaone considers That Thing Called Tadhana as her "dream project" and described it as  "more than 10 years’ worth of love stories, heartaches, heartbreaks, bitterness and acceptance". The lead protagonist, Mace was first drafted during 2014 while Jadaone was filming for Relaks, It's Just Pagibig, the character had a cameo appearance in the said film but was played by Alessandra De Rossi as opposed to Panganiban. During the post production of the film, the publishers of Whitney Houston's "Where Do Broken Hearts Go" charged the production crew ₱220,000 to use the song, but by this point the ₱2 million budget they had been awarded by the film festival had been used up. Eventually, the crew asked their friends to contribute ₱500 each in exchange of being mentioned in the ending credits of the film, showing the passion behind-the-scenes.

Release
That Thing Called Tadhana was met with both commercial and critical success and was praised as one of the highest grossing Filipino independent film of all time, breaching ₱134 million gross revenue in under 3 weeks, despite facing piracy issues online during its run. It was graded "A" by the Cinema Evaluation Board and given a PG rating by the MTRCB.

Reception

Critical response
ClickTheCity.com's Philbert Ortiz Dy praised the film by giving a 5 stars out of 5 rating. He writes:

Oggs Cruz of Rappler writes in a positive review:

Accolades

Sequel
According to actor JM de Guzman who played Anthony Lagdameo in the film, the director is already writing the script for the sequel. This was also confirmed by Panganiban that the film is currently in-development.

The director of the film (Jadaone) will return as the writer and director, stating that she would agree to work on a sequel, but “in the right conditions.”

References

External links 

 Official Trailer on YouTube

2014 films
Philippine romantic comedy films
Star Cinema films
Star Cinema comedy films
Philippine New Wave
Films directed by Antoinette Jadaone